Antillattus is a genus of Caribbean jumping spiders that was first described by E. B. Bryant in 1943. The name is a combination of "Antilles" and the common ending for salticid genera -attus.

Species
 it contains thirteen species, found only in Cuba and on the Greater Antilles:
Antillattus applanatus Zhang & Maddison, 2012 – Hispaniola
Antillattus cambridgei (Bryant, 1943) – Hispaniola
Antillattus cubensis (Franganillo, 1935) – Cuba
Antillattus darlingtoni (Bryant, 1943) – Hispaniola
Antillattus electus (Bryant, 1943) – Hispaniola
Antillattus gracilis Bryant, 1943 (type) – Hispaniola
Antillattus keyserlingi (Bryant, 1940) – Cuba
Antillattus mandibulatus (Bryant, 1940) – Cuba
Antillattus maxillosus (Bryant, 1943) – Hispaniola
Antillattus montanus (Bryant, 1943) – Hispaniola
Antillattus peckhami (Bryant, 1943) – Hispaniola
Antillattus placidus Bryant, 1943 – Hispaniola
Antillattus scutiformis Zhang & Maddison, 2015 – Hispaniola

References

Salticidae genera
Salticidae
Spiders of the Caribbean
Arthropods of the Dominican Republic